Balala the Fairies, or Balala, Little Magic Fairy (巴啦啦小魔仙, Bālālā xiǎo mó xian), is a Chinese magical girl metaseries created and produced by Alpha Group. Each series focuses on a group of magical girls fighting against evil and dark forces while following their ordinary lives and personal wishes. The first installment was the live-action series of the same name, which first aired in 2008. There were five seasons in total and 52 episodes.

Overview
Each season focuses on a group of girls, mainly Chinese schoolgirls, who are granted magical powers and talents and transform into the legendary warriors known as the "Fairies of Balala" to fight against unknown evil forces. Their strength will be contested many times until they find out. They will also gain more new items, stuff and abilities to fight evil, as the enemies get stronger from time to time.

The Magic Fairy Castle is a magical world, led by the Queen of Magic Fairies, where only magic fairies can learn magic and know how to use what they have learned to help others. The black magic fairy Xiao Yue, who is not right-minded, steals the black magic and steals the magic fairy's colorful stone, and is never seen again. Little Blue, the magic fairy who protects the colorful stone, came to earth in order to make up for her mistakes and to track down the magic fairy colorful stone. Little Blue hid in the octave box, was brought home by Ling Meiqi, Ling Meixue sisters, and became the Ling family's little nanny, the three spent a happy and joyful life together, and formed a deep friendship between each other. With the permission of the Queen of Magic Fairies, Xiaolan teaches Maggie and Michelle magic and makes them become little magic fairies on earth. At the same time, Xiao Yue befriended a girl named Lily Yan and trained her to become a little black magic fairy. Thus, a battle between good and evil kicks off ......

Television

Live-action series
 Balala the Fairies (2008–2009)
 Balala the Fairies: The Mystery Note (2015–2016)

Animated series
 Balala the Fairies: Rainbow Heart Stone (2011–2012)
 Balala the Fairies: Miracle Dance (2013–2014)
 Balala the Fairies: Finding Melody (2015–2016)
 Balala the Fairies: Over the Rainbow (2016–2017)
 Balala the Fairies: Ocean Magic (2018–2020)
 Balala the Fairies: Ocean Magic Season 2 (2020-2021)
 Balala the Fairies: Magic Interaction (2022)

Film
 Balala the Fairies: The Movie (2013)
 Balala the Fairies: The Magic Trial (2014)
 Balala the Fairies: Princess Camellia (2015)

Full series role list

The first "Balala Little Magic Fairy" (live action) characters 

 Magic Fairy Blu Sally - (Actor: Liao Jingxuan / Hong Kong dub: Wu Xiaoyi)
 Linglong - (Actor: Liao Jingxuan / Hong Kong dub: Wu Xiaoyi)
 Magic Fairy Little Moon Luna - (Actor: Zhou Jiao / Hong Kong dub: Jiang Li Yi)
 Maggie Ling - (Actor: Sun Qiao Lu / Hong Kong dub: Gu Yong Xue)
 Michelle Ling - (Actor: Wong On Yee / Hong Kong dub: Chong Qiao Er)
 Lily Yan Lily Yan - (Actor: Liu Mei-han / Hong Kong Dub: Qian Hui-ling)
 Queen / Queen of the Magic Fairies - (Actor: Wang Hui / Hong Kong Dub: Jelly Tang)
 You Le - (Actor: Yuan Qifeng / Hong Kong dub: Zhang Zhenxi)

Role of the second work "Balala Little Magician's Rainbow Heart Stone" (animation) 
Hong Kong dubbing is divided into Disney Channel and ATV two versions, due to the use of ATV newcomers, it can not fully provide ATV version information
 Maggie Ling (Mainland China dubbed by Chen Chui / Hong Kong dubbed by Gu Yongxue (Disney Channel), Zhuang Qiaoer (ATV) / Taiwan dubbed by Fu Qihui)
 Ling Mei Xue (Mainland China dubbed by Wang Xiao Le / Hong Kong dubbed by Chen Wuying Qi (Disney Channel), Gao Ling (ATV) / Taiwan dubbed by Wu Gui Chu)
 Little Blue (Mainland China dub: Liao Qi / Hong Kong dub: Lo Yuen Fung (Disney Channel), Ho Kai Yee (ATV) / Taiwan dub: Chien Ya Ching)
 Xiao Qian (Mainland China dub: Shi Xujie / Hong Kong dub: Tan Shuxian (Disney Channel), Chen in-law Qi (ATV) / Taiwan dub: Lin Pei screen)
 Amusement (Hong Kong dub: Zhang Zhenxi (Disney Channel) / Taiwan dub: Li Shiyang)
 Queen of Magic Fairies (Mainland China dubbing: Xu Xin / Hong Kong dubbing: Deng Jieli (Disney Channel), Tan Shuying (ATV) / Taiwan dubbing: Shi Caiwei)
 Teacher Qingqing (Mainland China dubbing: Chen Zui / Hong Kong dubbing: Chen Xueying (Disney Channel), (ATV) / Taiwan dubbing: Shi Caiwei)
 Xue Fei Fei (Mainland China dubbing: Chen Zui / Hong Kong dubbing: Chen Xue Ying (Disney Channel), ? (ATV))
 Witch God Tianlong (Mainland China dub: Wang Tianshui / Hong Kong dub: Yang Yaotai (Disney Channel), Chen Weiquan (ATV) / Taiwan dub: Li Shiyang)
 Shui Ling (Mainland China dub: Xu Xin / Hong Kong dub: ? (Disney Channel), Wu Xiaoyi (ATV) / Taiwan dubbing: Zhan Yajing)
Earth Spirit (Mainland China dub: Tim Sun / Hong Kong dub: ? (Disney Channel), ? (ATV) / Taiwan dubbing: Liang Xingchang)
Fire Spirit (Mainland China dub: Tim Sun / Hong Kong dub: ? (Disney Channel), ? (ATV) / Taiwan dubbing: Li Shiyang)

Publishing Novels 
(Press: The following novels are officially licensed)

In 2012, Zhou Yiwen's novel "Balala Little Magician's Rainbow Heart Stone - Dark Prince Grea", a complete set of eight volumes. They are: 

1. "Mysterious new students"; 

2. "The legend of the guardian stone"; 

3. "The dead tree of life" 

4. "Magic fairy prince play"; 

5. "Wish meteor"; 

6. "Evil magic line"; 

7. "The dark prince resurrection"; 

8. "The sad duel song

2013-2014, Peng Liu Rong novels "Balala Little Magic Fairy's Rainbow Heart Stone - Redemption of the Magic Spirit", a complete set of five volumes (unfinished). They are：

1. "Frozen Crystal Heart";

2. "Magic Aria"; 

3. "Breeze Fluttering" 

4. "Rosy Junior"; 

5. "Flaming Night Mystery".

References

External links 
 Official website 
 English website  

Chinese culture
Chinese animated television series
Chinese fantasy television series
Magical girl television series